Lois Corea Rehder (1911–1988) was an American malacologist. Her husband, Harald Alfred Rehder (1907–1996), was also a malacologist.

She named the genus Buchema and several species in Carinodrillia under her maiden name Lois F. Corea

Works 
 Corea, Lois Fleming. "New marine mollusks (with three plates)." (1934).

References
 Anonymous, 1988. Lois C. Rehder, Smithsonian volunteer. Washington Post, Feb. 18, 1988: B-6
 D. Raeihle, 1988. Lois C. Rehder. New York Shell Club Notes 306: 14

See also 
 List of malacologists

American malacologists
1911 births
1988 deaths
20th-century American zoologists